Kevin Sally (born 5 December 1972) is a Canadian archer. He competed in the men's individual and team events at the 1996 Summer Olympics.

References

External links
 

1972 births
Living people
Canadian male archers
Olympic archers of Canada
Archers at the 1996 Summer Olympics
Sportspeople from Richmond Hill, Ontario
Pan American Games medalists in archery
Pan American Games bronze medalists for Canada
Archers at the 1995 Pan American Games
Medalists at the 1995 Pan American Games
20th-century Canadian people